Tai Koo is a station on the  of the Hong Kong MTR system. The station is located in Kornhill, Quarry Bay on Hong Kong Island and serves the area including Kornhill, Kornhill Gardens and Taikoo Shing. Tai Koo has a unique crimson livery and is one of the busiest stations in the system.

The station was named for Taikoo Shing, the large-scale residential development built on the former site of Taikoo Dockyard, a Swire company, "Taikoo" being the Romanisation of the latter's Chinese name.

History
Excavation of the station cavern was completed in October 1983.

The Island line opening ceremony was held in this station in May 1985 and was officiated by then-MTR chairman Sir Wilfrid Newton and Governor of Hong Kong Edward Youde, who unveiled the commemorative plaques at the concourse level. The station is built in what was, at the time of its construction, the largest man-made cavern in Asia.

Station layout
Tai Koo adheres to the general layout of most MTR stations. At ground level, there are numerous alphanumerically-named entrances and exits.

Platforms 1 and 2 are arranged in the simple island platform layout. Unlike most of the other underground stations on the Island line, Tai Koo does not have separate tubes for each track and platform, but is located in a single tube encompassing both the concourse and the platform. Although it was not built in the cut and cover method, it is similar to cut and cover stations in that although there are escalators and stairs in the middle of the platform, it has an open design and the platforms are not separated. Each platform is equipped with platform screen doors for safety and ventilation reasons.

Entrances/exits
There are five groups of entrances and exits at Tai Koo station labeled A to E. In certain circumstances, there are subsets of these exit groups; these are marked with numbers.

A: at the northeast corner of King's Road and Kornhill Road
A1: for Kornhill Gardens blocks 1-4
A2: for Kornhill Plaza North
B: opposite the intersection of King's Road and Kornhill Road, for Kornhill blocks N-R
C: between Kornhill Road and Hong On Street, for Kornhill blocks A-M and Kornhill Plaza South
D: between King's Road and Taikoo Shing Road
D1: for Cityplaza, One Island East and East Hong Kong 
D2: for Cityplaza 
E: at northeastern corner of Kornhill Gardens at King's Road
E1: for Cityplaza
E2: for Kornhill Gardens blocks 5-6
E3: for Kornhill Gardens blocks 7-10

References

MTR stations on Hong Kong Island
Island line (MTR)
Quarry Bay
Railway stations in Hong Kong opened in 1985
1985 establishments in Hong Kong